John George Hancock (15 October 1857 – 19 July 1940) was a Liberal Party politician and Trade Unionist in the United Kingdom.

Background
He was the eldest son of Joseph Hancock of Pinxton, Derbyshire. In 1882 he married Mary Hoten of Pinxton.

Early career
Hancock worked at a pit as a boy. He formed the Pinxton Branch of the Nottinghamshire Miners' Association. In 1893 he became the General Secretary of the Nottinghamshire Miners' Association. He became a miners agent and the miners association Financial Secretary in 1896.

Political career
He was elected as (MP) for Mid Derbyshire at a by-election in July 1909, as a Liberal candidate, sponsored by the Derbyshire Miners Association. Hancock held the seat and managed a slightly reduced majority;

In 1909, he was one of a group of Miners Union sponsored Liberal MPs who were instructed by the Miners Federation of Great Britain to take the Labour party whip in the House of Commons and stand at the following election as Labour party candidates. Hancock held the seat at the following General election under his new party label;

He held the seat at the following General election;

He served as a Justice of the Peace in Nottinghamshire. Relations between the Labour and Liberal parties deteriorated after 1910 and they were expected to field candidates against each other in some cases at the next election, anticipated to be in 1915. Hancock decided that he would rather defend his seat as a Liberal, so crossed the floor in 1915 to re-join the Liberals. During the war he combined with future Labour MP George Spencer to attempt to take the Nottinghamshire Miners Association out of the Miners Federation of Great Britain political fund.   
He was then returned unopposed for the new Belper constituency. In 1921, after 25 years service, he stood down from the post of Financial Secretary of the Nottinghamshire Miners Association, but continued as a miners agent.  
He held the seat again at the 1922 election, this time, for the first time, against a Labour Party opponent.  

However, he was defeated at the 1923 general election by the Conservative Party candidate, Herbert Wragg.  

Aged 65, he did not stand for Parliament again. In 1927, following the General Strike, there was a split in the Nottinghamshire miners and Hancock followed the Association's General Secretary and Labour MP, George Spencer in the creation of the more moderate Nottinghamshire Miners' Industrial Union. Hancock became the breakaway union's Treasurer, serving until 1937 when the two miners organisations reunited.

References

External links 
 

1857 births
1940 deaths
Liberal Party (UK) MPs for English constituencies
Liberal-Labour (UK) MPs
Miners' Federation of Great Britain-sponsored MPs
UK MPs 1906–1910
UK MPs 1910
UK MPs 1910–1918
UK MPs 1918–1922
UK MPs 1922–1923
People from Pinxton